Visconti is an Italian surname. It may also refer to:

 Visconti Castle (disambiguation)
 Visconti (company), Italian manufacturer of luxury goods
 Visconti Park, Lombardy, Italy
 Alfa Romeo Visconti, a 2004 concept car